Protanura is a genus of springtails in the family Neanuridae. There are about six described species in Protanura.

Species
These six species belong to the genus Protanura:
 Protanura lutea Cassagnau & Peja, 1979 g
 Protanura mediterranea Stach, 1967 g
 Protanura monticellii Caroli, 1910 g
 Protanura papillata Cassagnau & Delamare Deboutteville, 1955 g
 Protanura pseudomuscorum (Börner, 1903) g
 Protanura quadrioculata (Borner, 1901) g
Data sources: i = ITIS, c = Catalogue of Life, g = GBIF, b = Bugguide.net

References

Further reading

 
 
 

Neanuridae
Springtail genera